Welker Cochran (October 7, 1897 – July 26, 1960) was an American professional carom billiards player who won world titles in two different disciplines, balkline and three-cushion billiards.

Biography
He was born in Des Moines, Iowa, but moved to Manson early.  He began playing at a young age in a billiards parlor owned by his father in Manson, and by the age of 17 was among the best players in the world.

He won his first world title in 1927 in 18.2 balkline. The popularity of balkline faded in the late 1920s and early 1930s, causing Cochran to switch to three-cushion, in which he won his first world title in 1933. In 1945, Cochran set a new world record (now surpassed) by achieving a game average of 3 (60 points in 20 innings) in a match he won against Willie Hoppe. He retired from serious competition in 1946 due to arthritis, but did make a comeback attempt in 1954.

He died on July 26, 1960 in Belmont, California.

Legacy
Cochran was inducted posthumously into the Billiard Congress of America's Hall of Fame in 1967.

Titles and tournament wins
 World 18.2 Balkline Championship (1927, 1934)
 World Three-Cushion Championship (1933, 1935-1936, 1944-1945)

References

External links 

 Photo of Announcement Board 15. April 1945 at Bensinger's Billiard Academy in Chicago.
 Photo of Welker Cochran at the game
 Brunswick Balke Collender Co. Poster, 1934. Featuring Welker Cochran.

Further reading
Robert Byrne, Byrne's Wonderful World of Pool and Billiards: A Cornucopia of Instruction, Strategy, Anecdote, and Colorful Characters, 1996

American carom billiards players
1897 births
1960 deaths
World champions in carom billiards